The Barth-Hempfling House is a historic house at 507 Main Street in North Little Rock, Arkansas.  It is a single-story wood-frame structure, five bays wide, with a side gable roof and vernacular Late Victorian styling.  It was built in 1886 for German immigrants, and is the last surviving house on Main Street in downtown North Little Rock, an area that was once lined with similar houses.

The house was listed on the National Register of Historic Places in 1986.  It is also a contributing element of the Argenta Historic District.

See also
National Register of Historic Places listings in Pulaski County, Arkansas

References

Houses on the National Register of Historic Places in Arkansas
Victorian architecture in Arkansas
Houses completed in 1886
Houses in North Little Rock, Arkansas
National Register of Historic Places in Pulaski County, Arkansas
Historic district contributing properties in Arkansas